Beckermet railway station is a disused rail station located in the village of Beckermet in Cumbria.

Tracks were laid southwards from Whitehaven and Moor Row as far as Egremont by the Whitehaven, Cleator and Egremont Railway, opening to passengers on 1 July 1857.

The Whitehaven and Furness Junction Railway company opposed this, so the two companies came to an accommodation and built the Egremont to Sellafield extension as a joint line. Beckermet was the sole intermediate passenger station on the extension.

The station was on the western edge of the village in Cumbria, England.

History

The line to Egremont was one of the fruits of the rapid industrialisation of West Cumberland in the second half of the nineteenth century, opening to passengers on 1 July 1857. This enabled traffic from the Cleator Moor and Rowrah areas, especially iron ore, to move much more readily southwards.

Services
A Saturdays Only evening train terminated at Moor Row. The southbound service was similar. There were no Sunday trains.

The LNWR and Furness Joint Railway divided traffic responsibilities so that passenger traffic through the station was usually worked by the Furness Railway.

Goods traffic was typical of an industrial area, sustaining sidings and goods depots long after passenger services were withdrawn.

Mineral traffic was the dominant flow, though this was subject to considerable fluctuation with trade cycles. A considerable amount of iron ore travelled south through Beckermet bound for the furnaces of Millom and Barrow-in-Furness.

Stations and signalling along the line south of Rowrah were changed during the Joint regime to conform to Furness Railway standards.

Rundown and closure
The station closed on 7 January 1935 when normal passenger traffic ended along the line.

Life flickered briefly in Spring 1940 when workmen's trains were reinstated to support a period of high activity building the Royal Ordnance Factory at Drigg, but that lasted less than a month.

A public Sellafield-Egremont-Beckermet-Moor Row-Whitehaven service was reinstated on 6 May 1946, only to be "suspended" on 16 June 1947, a victim of the post-war fuel crisis. Bradshaw still listed the service as Suspended in 1949. It was never reinstated.

Workmen's trains to Sellafield ended on 6 September 1965.

Initially this comprised eight steam-hauled carriages, ending typically formed of a pair of Derby Lightweight 2-car units. Sources differ on when this service ended:- 3 March 1969 or 11 December 1969. Sources are silent on whether this called at Beckermet or passed straight through.

See also

 Furness Railway
 Cleator and Workington Junction Railway
 Whitehaven, Cleator and Egremont Railway

References

Sources

Further reading

External links
The station on overlain OS maps surveyed from 1898, via National Library of Scotland
The closed station on a 1948 OS Map, via npe maps
Map of the line with photos, via RAILSCOT
The railways of Cumbria, via Cumbrian Railways Association
Photos of Cumbrian railways, via Cumbrian Railways Association
The railways of Cumbria, via Railways_of_Cumbria
Cumbrian Industrial History, via Cumbria Industrial History Society
The line's and station's Engineer's Line References, via railwaycodes.org.uk
Furness Railtour using many West Cumberland lines 5 September 1954, via sixbellsjunction
A video tour-de-force of the region's closed lines, via cumbriafilmarchive 

Disused railway stations in Cumbria
Railway stations in Great Britain opened in 1857
Railway stations in Great Britain closed in 1947
1857 establishments in England